Peptidyl-prolyl cis-trans isomerase NIMA-interacting 4 is an enzyme that in humans is encoded by the PIN4 gene.

References

Further reading